Tivoli is a football stadium in the Sport Park Soers in Aachen, Germany, that opened on 17 August 2009 replacing the Old Tivoli nearby. It hosts the home matches of Alemannia Aachen in the Regionalliga West. The stadium has a capacity of 31,026 spectators – space for 11,681 standing spectators and 19,345 seats. The (all-)seating capacity for international games is set at 27,250.

The city first suggested the new stadium should be built outside the city, near the local airport. However, fans wanted the stadium built within the city. After much debate, plans were released in February 2007, showing that the new stadium would be built in Sportpark Soers, the sporting area the previous stadium was in.

About €4.2 million of the construction costs were financed by bonds mainly targeted at supporters of Alemannia Aachen.

The first match in the new stadium was against the Belgian team Lierse SK, but it was closed for the public. The first Bundesliga-match took place on 17 August 2009 against FC St. Pauli which Aachen lost 0–5, which was the highest home-defeat in Aachen's history.

The first international match was on 4 September 2009 when the Germany national under-21 football team played their first match of the 2011 UEFA European Under-21 Football Championship qualification against San Marino, which they won 6–0.

Gallery

References

External links

 Stadium information 

Football venues in Germany
Buildings and structures in Aachen
Multi-purpose stadiums in Germany
Alemannia Aachen